Ashadh Ka Ek Din is a 1971 Hindi film based on play of the same name by Mohan Rakesh. The film directed by Mani Kaul starred Arun Khopkar, Rekha Sabnis, Om Shivpuri and Aruna Irani.

The film's story as in play is centered on a love triangle between Sanskrit poet Kalidas, Mallika and Priyangumanjari.

It went on to win Filmfare Critics Award for Best Movie in India.

Cast
Arun Khopkar as Kalidasa 
Rekha Sabnis as Mallika 
Om Shivpuri as Vilom
Aruna Irani

Soundtrack

References

External links
 

1971 films
Films directed by Mani Kaul
1970s Hindi-language films
Films about Kalidasa